This is a list of places on the Victorian Heritage Register in the City of Hobsons Bay in Victoria, Australia. The Victorian Heritage Register is maintained by the Heritage Council of Victoria.

The Victorian Heritage Register, as of 2021, lists 33 state-registered places within the City of Hobsons Bay:

References

Hobsons Bay
City of Hobsons Bay